The Little River is a 35 km river in the Cariboo region of British Columbia, Canada, rising in the Cariboo Mountains north of the North Arm of Quesnel Lake and running roughly westwards to enter Cariboo Lake conjointly with the upper Cariboo River.

See also
Little River, British Columbia, a community in the Comox Valley region of British Columbia
Little River (Vancouver Island), a stream in the Comox Valley region of British Columbia
Little River (Little Shuswap Lake), a river in the Shuswap Country region of British Columbia

References

Rivers of the Cariboo